Lake Feneketlen (Feneketlen-tó, "Bottomless Lake") is a lake in the 11th district of Budapest, Hungary.

The lake was formed in 1877, when clay was removed from the site to supply a brick factory that was situated at nearby Kosztolányi Dezső tér. The lake's water quality in the 1980s began to deteriorate, until a water circulation device was built.  The fishing is forbidden on this lake.

References

Feneketlen, Lake
Újbuda
Geography of Budapest